The 2023 Big 12 Conference baseball tournament will be held from May 24 through 28 at Globe Life Field in Arlington, Texas.  The annual tournament determines the conference champion of the Division I Big 12 Conference for college baseball.  The winner of the tournament will earn the league's automatic bid to the 2023 NCAA Division I baseball tournament.

The tournament has been held since 1997, the inaugural year of the Big 12 Conference.  Among current league members, Texas has won the most championships with five.  Among original members, Kansas State has never won the event.  Defending champion Oklahoma won their third championship in 2021, matching Oklahoma State.  Iowa State discontinued their program after the 2001 season without having won a title.  Having joined in 2013, TCU won titles in 2014, 2016, and 2021, while West Virginia has yet to win the Tournament.

Format and seeding
The top eight finishers from the regular season will be seeded one through eight, and will then play a two-bracket double-elimination tournament leading to a winner-take-all championship game.

Results

References

Big 12 Conference Baseball Tournament
Tournament
Big 12 Conference baseball tournament
Baseball competitions in Arlington, Texas
College sports tournaments in Texas